Leiva may refer to:
Leiva, Nariño, a municipality and town in the Nariño Department, Colombia
Leiva, Boyacá, a municipality in Boyacá Department, Colombia, largest town Villa de Leyva
Leiva River, a river in Chile
Leiva, La Rioja, a municipality in La Rioja, Spain
Leiva (singer) (born 1980), Spanish singer, songwriter and musician

People with the surname
Alberto Aguilar Leiva (born 1984), or simply known as Alberto, Spanish football (soccer) player
Andrés Díaz Venero de Leiva (died 1578), first president of the New Kingdom of Granada, appointed in 1564
Andrés Felipe Arias Leiva (born 1973), Colombian economist and minister
Antonio de Leyva, Duke of Terranova (1480–1536), Spanish general during the Italian Wars
Cristian Leiva (born 1977), Argentine football (soccer) player
David Leiva (born 1978), Argentine singer and politician
Francisco Leiva (1630–1676), dramatist of the Spanish Golden Age 
José María Sánchez Leiva (born 1985), Chilean football  (soccer) player
Lucas Leiva (born 1987), Brazilian football (soccer) player, currently playing for Liverpool F.C.
Maria Aracely Leiva (born 1967), Honduran politician
Martín Leiva (born 1980), Argentine basketball player
Miriam Leiva, Cuban-American mathematics educator
Ponciano Leiva (1821–1896), President of Honduras in late 1800s
Ronaldo Cecilio Leiva, Guatemalan military officer, minister
Salvador Dubois Leiva (1935–2015), Nicaraguan football (soccer) player

See also
Leivinha (born 1949), Brazilian football (soccer) player
Leyva (disambiguation), disambiguation page